Mok Un-ju (born 29 March 1981) is a North Korean former gymnast. She competed at the 2000 Summer Olympics.

References

External links
 

1981 births
Living people
North Korean female artistic gymnasts
Olympic gymnasts of North Korea
Gymnasts at the 2000 Summer Olympics
Place of birth missing (living people)
Gymnasts at the 1998 Asian Games
Asian Games competitors for North Korea